Jugezhuang Town is a town located in the Miyun District of Beijing, China. it is on the north of a mountainous region. The town is located to the south of Mujiayu and Taishitun Towns, west of Dachengzi Town, north of Dahuashan and Dongshaoqu Towns, and northeast of Henanzhai Town. In 2020, it had 22,032 residents within its borders.

Its name Jugezhuang comes from Jugezhuang Village, the seat of the town's government.

History

Administrative divisions 
By the end of 2021, Jugezhuang Town covered 29 subdivisions, more specifically these 3 communities and 26 villages:

Transportation 
Jugezhuang is connected to Beijing–Chengde railway and Beijing–Shenyang high-speed railway.

See also 
 List of township-level divisions of Beijing

References

Miyun District
Towns in Beijing